The Wolf Hunters may refer to:

 The Wolf Hunters (novel), a 1908 adventure novel by the American writer James Oliver Curwood 
 The Wolf Hunters (1926 film), an American silent film directed by Stuart Paton
 The Wolf Hunters (1949 film), an American film directed by Budd Boetticher